Mochlonyx is a genus of flies belonging to the family Chaoboridae.

The species of this genus are found in Europe and Northern America.

Species:
 Mochlonyx cinctipes (Coquillett, 1903) 
 Mochlonyx fuliginosus (Felt, 1905)

References

Chaoboridae